Solute carrier organic anion transporter family member 2B1 also known as organic anion-transporting polypeptide 2B1 (OATP2B1) is a protein that in humans is encoded by the gene SLCO2B1.

See also
 Solute carrier family

References

Further reading

Solute carrier family